Caecula kuro is an eel in the family Ophichthidae (worm/snake eels). It was described by Nagamichi Kuroda in 1947. It is a subtropical, marine eel which is known from Japan, in the northwestern Pacific Ocean. It inhabits shallow coastal waters.

References

Ophichthidae
Fish described in 1947
Taxa named by Nagamichi Kuroda